Mullovka is an urban locality (urban-type settlement) in Melekessky District of Ulyanovsk Oblast, Russia. Population:

References

Notes

Sources

Urban-type settlements in Ulyanovsk Oblast
Stavropolsky Uyezd (Samara Governorate)